Late Night Tales: Franz Ferdinand is a compilation album compiled by Scottish band Franz Ferdinand, released on 15 September 2014 as part of the Late Night Tales series. The mix includes tracks from artists such as R. Stevie Moore, Lee "Scratch" Perry, James Brown, Paul McCartney & Wings and Boards of Canada. It also features an exclusive Franz Ferdinand cover version of Jonathan Halper’s "Leaving My Old Life Behind".

Track listing

References

External links
 Official Franz Ferdinand website
 Official Late Night Tales: Franz Ferdinand page
 

2014 compilation albums
Franz Ferdinand